Servilia's pearl was a pearl given by Julius Caesar to his favourite mistress Servilia. It was described by imperial biographer Suetonius to be a lone (uniones, meaning "singleton") large black pearl worth six million sesterces (approximately 1.5 billion dollars in 2019 value), making it perhaps the most valuable gem of all time. It may also be the first known individual pearl recorded in human history.

Historical context

Caesar was said to be a great connoisseur of pearls; guessing their value just by weighing them in his palm was one of his party tricks, and during his consulship he had restricted the buying of pearls based on age, marital status and wealth. Unmarried women were not allowed to own them (this resulted in a surge in weddings in Rome) and people who were not affluent enough to acquire them safely without risking their financial security were banned from purchasing them.

There are conflicting reports on when exactly Caesar gave Servilia the pearl; some sources claim it happened during his first consulship in 59 BC while others state it was when he returned from the war in Gaul. If it was after the war it is possible that Caesar had acquired the pearl as a spoil of war during his campaign in Gaul, or possibly during his invasions of Britain, since the coasts of the island as well as Scottish lakes were prime location for harvesting pearls. Adrian Goldsworthy speculated in his book Caesar, Life of a Colossus that Caesar may have paid for the pearl with money he had gotten from a bribe from Pompey. Robert B. Kebric reflected that Caesar may have paid with tribute money he received from Pharaoh Ptolemy XII Auletes.

Value
Caesar spent 6 million sesterces on the pearl, which is about 1.5 billion American dollars in 2019 currency, although exact calculations of its value is impossible due to the difference in purchasing power, and economist Gilles Jacoud notes that for ridiculously expensive objects the actual value would become arbitrary for someone like Caesar who could afford anything. He expresses that Roman readers of Suetonius would likely have had a much better understanding for its actual exceptional value. Similarly Mary Saul, an expert of pearls and gastropod shells, states that: "we do not need to know the equivalent in today's currency to appreciate that he paid an enormous price [for it]". A contemporary comparison would be that 900 sesterces was the average yearly salary for an infantryman in one of Caesar's legions, or that it could pay for a year's rent for 3000 Roman tenants.

It has also been observed that when Caesar himself was held hostage by pirates as a young man, his ransom of 20 talents (approximately $250,000) was a mere fraction of the worth of the pearl he acquired for his mistress. During the turn of the 19th century it was noted that it is unlikely that any individual pearl of such value would appear again.

Analysis
Caesar's motives for giving the pearl to Servilia have been the subject of debate among historians.

Historically it has been popularly suggested that the pearl was an apology by Caesar to Servilia after an engagement between her son Brutus and Caesar's daughter Julia fell apart, but since later research has all but confirmed that no such engagement existed (the marriage was likely supposed to be between Julia and a man by the same name) this explanation has been largely abandoned. An alternative related theory put forth by Ramon L. Jiménez is that the pearl was indeed gifted to make up for Julia's broken engagement, but not to Servilia's son, but to Servilia's brother who did bear the same name as her son at the time.

Other interpretations range from that of Friedrich Münzer and his followers who believed that the pearl was an earnest marriage proposal by Caesar, that he used it to overshadow the pearls famously displayed by Pompey in his 61 BC triumph, that it was simply a present meant to soothe Servilia after Caesar had agreed to marry the younger Calpurnia, to that of the majority of modern historians who just see it as Caesar feeling he was able to spend any money he wanted on his beloved mistress without any ulterior motives. Robert B. Kebric mused that "the pearl may only indicate the first opportunity that the previously debtridden Caesar had to give his mistress a gift worthy of his love for her".

Cultural depictions

Servilia and the pearl are the subject of poems by Hafiz and John Dryden. In the 1916 story "War" from The Drama magazine a pearl which is on sale is stated to perhaps be Servilia's pearl. In the play Marcus Brutus and Silver Queen Saloon the titular Brutus becomes enraged at Caesar and his mother due to her accepting the pearl.

In Thornton Wilder's 1948 novel The Ides of March the pearl is given to Servilia in gratitude because Caesar suspects that Brutus is his natural son. Here the pearl is described as "rose" in color. In his foreword to the book Wilder also made sure to note that the event of Caesar giving Servilia the extravagant pearl is indeed historical. In the novel The Written Script by Annalita Marsigli it is portrayed that Caesar gifted Servilia the pearl to make her boast publicly that he had seduced her, which was a move by him to get back at her half-brother Cato. In Love is a Pie: Stories and Plays the gifting of the pearl causes Caesar's wife Pompeia to be enraged with him. In Rubicon: The Last Years of the Roman Republic by Tom Holland, Caesar compares buying the outrageously expensive pearl for Servilia to his decision to pay for 3000 Romans rents, both being moves to seduce his fellow citizens, he expresses that he thinks nothing of it. In Prepare Them for Caesar, by Mary Louise Mabie, Servilia's brother Cato comments that the pearl is too valuable to actually wear. Many novels have depicted the outdated perception that the pearl was a consolation for the broken engagement between their respective children, such as in Respublica: A Novel of Cicero's Roman Republic by Richard Braccia, and in Caesar: Let the Dice Fly by Colleen McCullough's (from the Masters of Rome series) in which it is described as pink (perhaps inspired by Wilder). In The Field of Swords the pearl is meant as a wedding proposal and Servilia initially rejects it, throwing it back at Caesar, because she believes she is infertile and does not want to make him enter a marriage which has no chance of conceiving children.  In the novel Cleopatra: Whispers from the Nile, by Lorraine Blundell, Servilia looks at and thinks of the pearl, reflecting on how it is the most extravagant gift she had ever received by her love.

The pearl is mentioned in Jules Verne's classical novel Twenty Thousand Leagues Under the Sea as an example of an extraordinarily valuable pearl. Commercial pearls named after Servilia have been sold.

The pearl is the plot device in the story The Eye of the Minotaur of the Franco-Belgian comic Alix, in this story it is shown that the pearl is cursed and slowly poisoning Servilia, prompting Caesar to send Alix, his companion Enak and Brutus on a journey to find the merchant who sold it to him.

See also
 Roman currency
 Tahitian pearl
 List of individual gemstones

Notes

References

Further reading
 Oysters, and All about Them: Being a Complete History of the Titular Subject, Exhaustive on All Points of Necessary and Curious Information from the Earliest Writers to Those of the Present Time, with Numerous Additions, Facts, and Notes, Part 2
 Servilia Caeponis on Prezi
 La perle de Servilia (note sur la naissance de Marcus Junius Brutus), Danielle Porte

External links

 Cesare e Servilia: storia di una perla nera, 11/08/2020, Castello di Corigliano Calabro

Servilia (mother of Brutus)
Individual pearls